Santa Gertrudis is a town, and the seat of municipality of the same name, located in the region of the Valleys in the Mexican state of Oaxaca.  It is approximately 41 km from the capital city of Oaxaca.

Climate
Its climate is temperate, with prevailing winds from the north.

Cuisine
Regional cuisine consists of mole accompanied with white rice, beef stew, pork liver with scrambled egg (for breakfast)and typical drinks as chocolate, chocolate atole, tejate, and mescal.

The municipality
As municipal seat, Santa Gertrudis has governing jurisdiction over the following communities: Barrio del Panteón, La Barda Paso de Piedras, La Esmeralda, and Tercera Sección (Santa Gertrudis).

References
 Enciclopedia de los Municipios de México ESTADO DE OAXACA
 www.mapasmexico.net for Santa Gertrudis Oaxaca

Populated places in Oaxaca